Fargo (/ˈfɑɹɡoʊ/) is a city in and the county seat of Cass County, North Dakota, United States. According to the 2020 census, its population was 125,990, making it the most populous city in the state and the 219th-most populous city in the United States. Fargo, along with its twin city of Moorhead, Minnesota, and the adjacent cities of West Fargo, North Dakota and Dilworth, Minnesota, form the core of the Fargo, ND – Moorhead, MN Metropolitan Statistical Area. The MSA had a population of 248,591 in 2020.

Fargo was founded in 1871 on the Red River of the North floodplain. It is a cultural, retail, health care, educational, and industrial center for southeastern North Dakota and northwestern Minnesota. North Dakota State University is located in the city.

History

Early history

Historically part of Sioux (Dakota) territory, the area that is present-day Fargo was an early stopping point for steamboats traversing the Red River during the 1870s and 1880s. The city was originally named "Centralia," but was later renamed "Fargo" after Northern Pacific Railway director and Wells Fargo Express Company founder William Fargo (1818–1881). The area started to flourish after the arrival of the Northern Pacific Railroad and the city became known as the "Gateway to the West."

During the 1880s, Fargo became the "divorce capital" of the Midwest because of lenient divorce laws.

A major fire struck the city on June 7, 1893, destroying 31 blocks of downtown Fargo, but the city was immediately rebuilt with new buildings made of brick, new streets, and a water system. More than 246 new buildings were built within one year. There were several rumors concerning the cause of the fire.

The North Dakota Agricultural College was founded in 1890 as North Dakota's land-grant university, becoming first accredited by the North Central Association in 1915. In 1960, NDAC became known as North Dakota State University.

20th century

Early in the century, the automobile industry flourished, and in 1905, Fargo became home to the Pence Automobile Company.

On Labor Day in 1910, Theodore Roosevelt visited Fargo to lay the cornerstone of the college's new library.  To a crowd of 30,000, Roosevelt spoke about his first visit to Fargo 27 years earlier, and credited his experience homesteading in North Dakota for his eventual rise to the presidency.

Fargo-Moorhead boomed after World War II, and the city grew rapidly despite a violent F5 tornado in 1957 that destroyed a large part of the north end of the city. Ted Fujita, famous for his Fujita tornado scale, analyzed pictures of the Fargo tornado, helping him develop his ideas for "wall cloud" and "tail cloud." These were the first major scientific descriptive terms associated with tornadoes. The construction of two interstates (I-29 and I-94) revolutionized travel in the region and pushed growth of Fargo to the south and west of the city limits. In 1972, the West Acres Shopping Center, the largest shopping mall in North Dakota, was constructed near the intersection of the two Interstates. This mall became a catalyst for retail growth in the area.

Recent history

Fargo has continued to expand rapidly but steadily. Since the mid-1980s, the bulk of new residential growth has occurred in the south and southwest areas of the city due to geographic constraints on the north side. The city's major retail districts on the southwest side have likewise seen rapid development.

Downtown Fargo has been gentrified due in part to investments by the city and private developers in the Renaissance Zone. Most older neighborhoods, such as Horace Mann, have either avoided decline or been revitalized through housing rehabilitation promoted by planning agencies to strengthen the city's core.

NDSU has grown rapidly into a major research university and forms a major component of the city's identity and economy. Most students live off-campus in the surrounding Roosevelt neighborhood. The university has established a presence downtown through both academic buildings and apartment housing. In addition, NDSU Bison Football has gained a significant following among many area residents.

Since the late 1990s, the Fargo-Moorhead Metropolitan Statistical Area has consistently had one of the lowest unemployment rates among MSAs in the United States. Coupled with Fargo's low crime rate and the decent supply of affordable housing in the community, this has prompted Money magazine to rank the city near the top of its annual list of America's most livable cities throughout the late 1990s and early 2000s.

Recently Fargo has been ranked by ZipRecruiter as the "#1 Hottest Job Market". Zippia ranked Fargo as the "#1 city to start a career." Today ranked Fargo as the "#3 best place to raise kids."

Geography

Fargo is a core city of the Fargo-Moorhead metropolitan area, which also includes Moorhead, West Fargo, and Dilworth and outlying communities.

Fargo sits on the western bank of the Red River of the North in a flat geographic region known as the Red River Valley. The Red River Valley resulted from the withdrawal of glacial Lake Agassiz, which drained away about 9,300 years ago. The lake sediments deposited from Lake Agassiz made the land around Fargo some of the richest in the world for agricultural uses.

Seasonal floods due to the rising water of the Red River, which flows from the United States into Lake Winnipeg in Manitoba, Canada, have presented challenges. The Red flows northward, which means melting snow and river ice, as well as runoff from its tributaries, often create ice dams causing the river to overflow. Fargo's surrounding Red River Valley terrain is essentially flat, leading to overland flooding. Since the potentially devastating 2009 Red River flood, both Fargo and Moorhead have taken great strides in flood protection; only a near-record flood would cause concern today. Work on the FM Diversion has begun and upon completion, it will permanently floodproof the metro for 500-year floods.

Its location makes the city vulnerable to flooding during seasons with above-average precipitation. The Red River's minor flood stage in Fargo begins at a level of 18 feet, with major flooding categorized at 30 feet and above. Many major downtown roadways and access to Moorhead are closed off at this level. Record snowfalls late in 1996 led to flooding in 1997, causing the Red to rise to a record crest of 39.5 feet, nearly overtaking city defenses. In 2008–2009, significant fall precipitation coupled with rapid snowmelt in March 2009 caused the Red to rise to a new record level of 40.84 feet, but again Fargo remained safe, in large part due to flood mitigation efforts instituted after the 1997 event and sandbagging efforts by the city residents. Further upgrades were made to city infrastructure and additional resources brought to bear following the 2009 flood, which caused no issues for the city in 2010 despite another rapid melt that caused the Red to rise to 37 feet (which ranks among the top-ten highest levels ever recorded). The estimated $1.5 billion FM diversion project is under construction and will channel the Red's water away from the city. As of 2012, Fargo has bought 700 houses in flood-prone areas.

Climate
Because of its location in the Great Plains and its distance from both mountains and oceans, Fargo has an extreme humid continental climate (Köppen Dfb), featuring long, bitterly cold winters and warm to hot, humid summers. It lies in USDA Plant hardiness zone 4a. Spring and autumn are short and highly variable seasons. On average, the first and last dates to see a minimum at or below the freezing mark are September 30 and May 8, respectively, allowing a growing season of 144 days.

In 2011, Fargo won The Weather Channel's "America's Toughest Weather City" poll. After almost 850,000 votes, blizzards, cold, and floods secured the title for the city.

Demographics

2010 census
As of the census of 2010, there were 105,549 people living in the city. The racial makeup of the city was 90.2% White; 2.7% African American; 3.0% Asian; 1.4% Native American; 0.6% from other races; and 2.1% from two or more races. Hispanic or Latino people of any race were 2.2% of the population.

There were 46,791 households, of which 24.2% had children under the age of 18 living with them, 36.8% were married couples living together, 8.6% had a female householder with no husband present, 3.9% had a male householder with no wife present, and 50.7% were non-families. 36.6% of all households were made up of individuals, and 8.3% had someone living alone who was 65 years of age or older. The average household size was 2.15 and the average family size was 2.87.

The median age in the city was 30.2 years. 19.4% of residents were under the age of 18; 19.6% were between the ages of 18 and 24; 29% were from 25 to 44; 21.7% were from 45 to 64, and 10.1% were 65 years of age or older. The gender makeup of the city was 50.4% male and 49.6% female.

The median household income was $44,304, and the median income for a family was $69,401, with the mean family income being $89,110. The per capita income for Fargo was $29,187. About 16.0% of the population and 7.7% of families were below the poverty line.

2000 census
As of the census of 2000, there were 90,599 people, 39,268 households, and 20,724 families living in the city. The racial makeup of the city was 94.2% White; 1.0% African American; 1.2% Native American; 1.6% Asian; <0.1% Pacific Islander; 0.4% from other races; and 1.5% from two or more races. Hispanic or Latino people of any race were 1.3% of the population.

The top seven ancestry groups in the city are German (40.6%); Norwegian (35.8%); Irish (8.6%); Swedish (6.5%); English (5.2%); French (4.7%); Italian (3.6%).

There were 39,268 households, of which 26.5% had children under the age of 18 living in them; 41.8% were married couples living together; 7.8% had a female householder with no husband present; and 47.2% were non-families. 34.6% of all households were made up of individuals, and 8.0% had someone living alone who was 65 years of age or older. The average household size was 2.20 and the average family size was 2.91.

In the city, the population was spread out, with 21.1% under the age of 18; 19.2% from 18 to 24; 31.1% from 25 to 44; 18.5% from 45 to 64; and 10.1% who were 65 years of age or older. The median age was 30 years. For every 100 females, there were 100.0 males. For every 100 females age 18 and over, there were 99.3 males.

As of 2000, the median income for a household in the city was $35,510, and the median income for a family was $50,486. Males had a median income of $31,968 versus $22,264 for females. The per capita income for the city was $21,101. About 6.6% of families and 11.8% of the population were below the poverty line, including 10.8% of those under age 18 and 7.5% of those age 65 or over.

Economy
The economy of the Fargo area has historically been dependent on agriculture. That dominance has decreased substantially in recent decades. Today the city of Fargo has a growing economy based on food processing, manufacturing, technology, retail trade, higher education, and healthcare. In a study published by Forbes, Fargo was ranked the best small city in the nation to start a business or a career.

Largest employers
According to the city's 2019 Comprehensive Annual Financial Report, the largest employers in the city are:

Arts and culture
Fargo offers a wide variety of cultural opportunities for a city of its size. This is likely due, in part, to the presence of three universities in the area. Most theater and events are either promoted or produced by the universities, although there are several private theater companies in the city including Fargo-Moorhead Community Theatre (FMCT), Theatre 'B' in downtown Fargo, Ursa Major Productions, Music Theatre Fargo Moorhead, Tin Roof Theatre Company, The Entertainment Company and others. Music organizations in the area include the Fargo-Moorhead Opera, the Fargo-Moorhead Symphony Orchestra, and the Fargo-Moorhead Youth Symphony. Fargo also boasts a dance company in the Fargo-Moorhead Ballet.

The Fargo Theatre is a restored 1926 Art Deco movie house that features first-run movies, film festivals, and other community events. The Fargodome routinely hosts concerts, Broadway musicals, dance performances, sporting events, as well as fairs and other gatherings.

The Winter Carnival in Fargo is a tradition that began in 1928.
Plains Art Museum is the largest museum of art in the state. It is in downtown Fargo and features regional and national exhibits. It also houses a large permanent collection of art. There are several other museums in Fargo including The Children's Museum at Yunker Farm, The Fargo Air Museum, The Courthouse Museum, The Roger Maris Museum in West Acres Shopping Center, the North Dakota State University Wall of Fame in the Scheels All Sports store and the historic Bonanzaville village (West Fargo).

Libraries
The Fargo Public Library was established in 1900 and for many years was housed in a Carnegie-funded building. In 1968, the library moved into a new facility as part of urban renewal efforts in the downtown area.  The original 1968 building was demolished and replaced with a new library which opened in 2009. In addition, Fargo Public Library operates the Dr. James Carlson Library in south Fargo, and the Northport branch in north Fargo.  In 2002 and 2006, the Southpointe and Northport Branches were opened serving the city's south and north sides. The Dr. James Carlson Library, which replaced the earlier Southpointe Branch, opened to the public on November 16, 2007. A new downtown Main Library opened April 25, 2009.  The Fargo Public Library is headquartered in downtown Fargo.

In 2014, over 1 million items were checked out from Fargo Public Library.  Books and magazines made up nearly half of the total and digital media and other non-print items made up more than a third. The rest were inter-library loans and renewals.

Museums
 Bonanzaville, USA – In West Fargo, North Dakota, is a village made up of many historic buildings from the region. It includes a church, school building, and log cabins. It is named after the historic bonanza farms of the area.
 Fargo Air Museum – features aircraft from World War II and beyond. Also hosts traveling exhibits.
 Plains Art Museum – large art museum in a historic downtown building. It features regional and national exhibits.
 The Roger Maris Museum – small, free museum dedicated to Roger Maris in a wing of the West Acres Shopping Center. Features memorabilia and a video presentation about the New York Yankees player who lived in Fargo for a portion of his life.
 Maury Wills Museum – At Newman Outdoor Field the Maury Wills Museum is in honor of the former 1962 National League MVP and Major League Baseball player who worked for the RedHawks as a coach and as a radio analyst.
 Hjemkomst Center – In Moorhead, MN. It displays and interprets the Hjemkomst replica Viking ship that was sailed to Norway. In addition, it is home of the Clay County Historical Society museum and archives and features a replica Norwegian Hopperstad Stave Church.
 Rourke Art Museum – In Moorhead, Minnesota, this museum displays fine art.

Theaters
 Fargo-Moorhead Community Theatre presents comedies, dramas, youth shows, and musicals in a theatre in Island Park south of downtown.
 Fargo Theatre is a 1926 Art Deco movie theater which presents classic and current films, live productions, and other events.
 Main Avenue Theatre hosts live productions by local independent theater company Theatre B.
 Trollwood Performing Arts School is a summer theatre arts program for students of all ages. The school presents many different forms of performing arts every summer, the most prominent being a Broadway musical performed in front of up to 2,500 audience members per night at an outdoor amphitheater.
 The Gooseberry Park Players are a not-for profit, fee-free theatre company for individuals 11–18 years old. Every summer in late July, they present a show at the Frances Frazier Comstock Theatre on the campus of Concordia College.
 The Fargo-Moorhead Opera is a non-profit, professional opera company. It has two to three productions each year, as well as international dinners and an annual gala. It is the only professional opera company between Minneapolis, Billings, Winnipeg and Omaha.

Tallest buildings

The tallest buildings in Fargo include:
 RDO Building (height: 254 ft; Built 2018–2020, 18 floors) Formally known as the Block 9 Tower. As of 2021 it is the tallest building in North Dakota.
 Radisson Hotel (height: 206 ft 8 in; 63 m, built 1985, 18 floors)
 Lashkowitz High Rise (height: 203 ft 4 in; 62 m, built 1970, 22 floors)
 Sanford Medical Center (height: 199 ft 8 in; built 2012, 11 floors)
 Cathedral of St. Mary (height: 170 ft 3 in; 52 m, built 1899)
 First Lutheran Church (height: 167 ft 4 in; 51 m, built 1920)
 Sts. Anne and Joachim Catholic Church (Fargo) (Height 130 ft) (Built 1995–2010)
 Fargodome (height: 125 ft; 38 m, built 1992)
 Bank of the West tower (Height 122 ft, 10 stories) Purchased by Bell Bank in 2021. Name change expected 2022
 Black Building (Height: 108 ft 0 in; Built 1931) Tallest building in North Dakota from 1931 to 1934 when the new ND Capitol building was completed at 241 feet high, which as of April 2021, remains the tallest building in the state today'

Attractions
 North Dakota Horse Park – features live racing and betting.
 Red River Zoo –  zoo that features 80 species of animals. Also includes a restored 1928 carousel.
 Fargo Outdoor Skate Park – outdoor skate park at the Dike West.
 West Acres Shopping Center – home to more than 120 stores that encompass approximately 950,000 square feet.

Sports
 North Dakota State Bison, an NCAA Division I university with 14 varsity sports and club sports. North Dakota State's football team won five consecutive FCS National Championships between 2011 and 2015, and three more in 2017, 2018, and 2019 and hosted ESPN's College GameDay (in downtown Fargo) in 2013 and 2014.
 Fargo-Moorhead RedHawks Independent Baseball Organization started in 1996 and is a 5 Time Northern League Champion and current member of the American Association
 Fargo Post#2 of the North Dakota American Legion baseball league
 Fargo Marathon
 Fargo Force, a tier 1 USHL hockey team
 Fargo Moorhead Derby Girls (FMDG) women's roller derby league was founded in May 2009 and plays at the Skateland Roller Center in Fargo. Every game in their 2009–2010 season was sold out.

Parks and recreation
The Fargo Park District operates many neighborhood parks throughout the city. The Fargo area contains the following golf courses: Edgewood Golf Course (18-hole), Fargo Country Club (18-hole) Rose Creek Golf Course (18-hole), El Zagal (9-hole), Prairiewood Golf Course (9-hole), and the new Osgood Golf Course (9-hole). In the winter Edgewood serves as a warming house and also provides cross country skis. Rose Creek and Osgood golf courses offer golfing lessons in the summer months. Fargo also has a skate park near dike west and Island park. Fargo and sister city Moorhead also hold ferry rides during the summer, on the historic Red River, to promote education of the fertile soil of the Red River Valley.

Arenas and auditoriums

 Fargodome – indoor arena on the NDSU campus. It plays host to all NDSU home football games and is also used for concerts and trade shows. The facility also hosts the high school wrestling national freestyle and Greco-Roman championships take place every year.
 Newman Outdoor Field – Baseball stadium, host to the Fargo-Moorhead RedHawks and NDSU Bison baseball. Located at 1515 15th Ave N, Fargo on NDSU campus.
 Reineke Fine Arts Center – On the NDSU campus. The university uses the center for concerts, theatrical presentations, and other events.
 Fargo Civic Center – indoor arena used to host trade shows, sporting events, meetings, community events, concerts, and disaster relief.
 John E. Carlson Coliseum – This arena is host to the Fargo North High School and Fargo South High School hockey teams as well as the FM Jets hockey team, before the team left Fargo. The arena was built in 1968 and has previously been home to the Fargo Blazers and NDSU Club hockey teams. The arena is also for figure skating. The Coliseum hosts the largest squirt hockey tournament in the world, the Fargo Flyers Squirt International Hockey Tournament.
 Scheels Arena – On June 27, 2007, Fargo held a groundbreaking for the $25 million Urban Plains Center ice hockey arena. Its first event was a Fargo Force Hockey home game on Thursday, October 30, 2008. The arena is used for the United States Hockey League's Fargo Force, Fargo high school hockey, and other concerts and special events. The Urban Plains Center was renamed Scheels Arena on October 6, 2010. The arena opened a second sheet of ice connected to the facility in June 2016.

Government

Fargo uses the city commission style of local government. Four commissioners and a mayor are elected at large for four year terms. Dr. Tim Mahoney is Fargo's current mayor.  The Fargo City Commission meets every two weeks in its chambers above the Fargo Civic Center. The meetings are broadcast on a Government-access television (GATV) cable channel. Fargo became the first city in the U.S. to use approval voting for elections in 2018.

In 2017, there was an attempt to recall City Commissioner Dave Piepkorn by a group who argued his constant expressing of concern over refugee resettlement in the city was a xenophobic dog-whistle meant to rile up anti-refugee sentiment in the community. While the group says it did reach the required number of signatures, it ultimately chose not to submit them because they did not know how many signatures would be eliminated in the review process, and Commissioner Piepkorn threatened to obtain the list of signers via FOIA request, which was interpreted as a political threat by the group.

Fargo was historically a Republican-leaning area. As recently as the 2004 presidential election, George W. Bush carried Fargo as well as the rest of Cass County with nearly 60 percent of the vote in both areas. Fargo has become more politically diverse and competitive. Since 2008, no Republican presidential candidate has received over 50% of the vote in Cass County. In 2008, Democratic candidate Barack Obama won the majority of votes in Cass County, with a voting percentage very close to the percentage Obama received in the entire nation, while John McCain won the majority of votes in North Dakota. Mitt Romney's winning margin in 2012 over Barack Obama in Cass County was 49.9% to 47% while Donald Trump received 49.3% of votes in 2016 compared to 38.8% against Hillary Clinton and 11.9% for third party candidates. In 2018, Democratic Senator Heidi Heitkamp achieved a 14-point lead in Eastern North Dakota even though the state as a whole soundly elected Republican Kevin Cramer.

Education
Primary and secondary schools

The Fargo Public Schools system serves most of the city, operating fifteen elementary schools, three middle schools, and four high schools: Fargo North High School, Fargo South High School, Judge Ronald N. Davies High School, and an alternative high school (Dakota High School). The original high school in the city was Central High School.

The West Fargo Public Schools system serves the southwestern part of the city, in addition to West Fargo itself and the surrounding communities of Horace and Harwood.

In addition to public schools, a number of private schools also operate in the city. The John Paul II Catholic Schools Network operates Holy Spirit Elementary, Nativity Elementary, Sacred Heart Middle School, and Shanley High School. Additionally, the Oak Grove Lutheran School and Park Christian School (which is in Moorhead, Minnesota) serve grades Pre-K through 12, while Grace Lutheran School serves grades Pre-K through 8.

Higher education

Fargo is home to North Dakota State University (NDSU), which has over 14,500 students. NDSU was founded in 1890 as the state land grant university focusing on agriculture, engineering and science, but has since branched out to cover many other fields of study. NDSU, along with Minnesota State University Moorhead and Concordia College in Moorhead, form the Tri-College University system of Fargo-Moorhead. Students can take classes at any of the three institutions. These three colleges also form a vibrant student-youth community of over 25,000.
NDSCS-Fargo is a campus of North Dakota State College of Science. Located in the Skills and Technology Training Center on 19th Avenue North in Fargo, NDSCS-Fargo serves as the home to academic programming and non-credit training.

Fargo is also home to several private collegiate institutions, including Rasmussen College, a branch location of the University of Mary, and Master's Baptist College operated by Fargo Baptist Church.  The University of Jamestown's Doctor of Physical Therapy program is based in Fargo.

MediaThe Forum of Fargo-Moorhead is the city's major newspaper. The High Plains Reader, an independent weekly newspaper, also operates in the community. North Dakota State University's student paper, The Spectrum, is printed twice weekly during the academic year. The city is also served by other publications such as Area Woman, From House To Home, Bison Illustrated, OPEN Magazine, Fargo Monthly, Design & Living, and Valley Faith.

Fargo is also home to several radio and television stations. Gray Television owns NBC affiliate KVLY-TV and CBS affiliate KXJB-LD, and Red River Broadcasting owns Fox affiliate KVRR. Forum Communications, which also owns The Forum, owns ABC affiliate WDAY-TV and WDAY radio. Major Market Broadcasting owns MyNetworkTV affiliate KRDK-TV, which was formerly CBS affiliate KXJB. Prairie Public Broadcasting operates KFME-TV, a PBS station, and also operates NPR affiliate KDSU-FM (however, KDSU is owned by North Dakota State University). Midwest Communications operating under Midwest Radio of Fargo-Moorhead, owns KFGO-AM/FM, KVOX-FM, KOYY, KRWK and KNFL.  Conservative talk host Scott Hennen owns WZFG, and Great Plains Integrated Marketing owns KQLX, KQLX-FM and KEGK.  Local resident James Ingstad operates eight radio stations under RFM Media, including KBVB, KPFX, KLTA, KQWB-FM, KQWB-AM, KBMW-FM, and K233CY.

KNDS 96.3 FM is an FCC approved radio station, owned with a license held by the independent Alliance for the Arts, operating on the 96.3 frequency in Fargo, North Dakota and the surrounding area. KNDS strives to provide the area with independent music not heard elsewhere in the FM radio community, while maintaining an emphasis on community/area partnership. North Dakota State University's ThunderRadio club operates the station 

KRFF-LP is a local, non-profit, listener-supported independent radio station serving the Fargo-Moorhead metro area. Radio Free Fargo previously worked to run KNDS.

Fargo has four local yellow pages publishers: SMARTSEARCH, which is locally owned and operated; yellowbook, owned by the Yell Group, a United Kingdom-based company; Dex, owned by RH Donnelley and based in North Carolina; and Phone Directories Company (PDC), based in Utah.

Infrastructure
Transportation

Fargo is a major transportation hub for the surrounding region. It sits at the crossroads of two major interstate highways, two transcontinental railroads and is the home of an airport.

Fargo is served by Hector International Airport (named after Martin Hector), which has the longest public runway in the state.  An Air National Guard unit and the Fixed-Base Operation Fargo Jet Center and Vic's Aircraft Sales are also at Hector.

The Fargo-Moorhead metro area is served by a bus service known as MATBUS. The bus service operates routes Monday-Saturday, many of which specifically cater to the area's college student population, who comprise half of its ridership. Greyhound Lines, Jefferson Lines and Rimrock Stages Trailways bus services additionally link Fargo to other communities.

The BNSF Railway runs through the metropolitan area as successor to the Great Northern Railway and Northern Pacific Railroad. Amtrak service is provided via the Empire Builder passenger train at the Fargo Amtrak station.

The city sits at the intersection of Interstate 29 and Interstate 94. U.S. Highway 81, U.S. Highway 10, and U.S. Highway 52 also run through the community.

The street system of Fargo is structured in the classic grid pattern. Routes that run from north to south are called streets, and routes that run from east to west are called avenues.

The major north–south roads (from west to east) include:

 45th Street
 42nd Street
 Interstate 29
 25th Street
 University Drive (one-way southbound from 19th Avenue North until 13th Avenue South)
 10th Street (Carries northbound University Drive traffic from 13th Avenue South until 19th Avenue North)

The major east–west roads (from north to south) include:
 40th Avenue North
 19th Avenue North
 12th Avenue North (Also known as North Dakota Highway 294; ND 294 is unsigned)
 Main Avenue
 13th Avenue South
 Interstate 94
 32nd Avenue South
 52nd Avenue South

Notable people

In popular cultureFargo is an Academy Award–winning 1996 film which takes place primarily throughout Minnesota.  Fargo is only seen briefly at the film's opening scene set in a bar and mentioned only twice in the film. None of Fargo was shot on location in or near Fargo.  A television series based on the film debuted in 2014, and occasionally featured the city in episodes.

Fargo was the setting of Season 1 Episode 1 of Project Blue Book''. The episode was based loosely on a UFO encounter called a Gorman dogfight taking place over the area.

Sister cities
Fargo has three sister cities:
Hamar, Norway
Vimmerby, Sweden
Martin, Slovakia

See also
 Fargo-Moorhead Toll Bridge
 Hector International Airport
 National Register of Historic Places listings in Cass County, North Dakota – with more than 20 Fargo properties
 Roman Catholic Diocese of Fargo
 USS Fargo, 2 ships

Notes

References

Bibliography

External links

 
 Fargo Visitors Bureau – exists to promote Fargo, North Dakota as a destination for visitors
 Historic images of Fargo

 
Cities in North Dakota
Cities in Cass County, North Dakota
County seats in North Dakota
Populated places established in 1871
1871 establishments in Dakota Territory